Geitanger or Geitung is an island in Øygarden Municipality in Vestland county, Norway.  The  island is entirely car-free, and the population of the island is very low.

See also
List of islands of Norway

References

Islands of Vestland
Øygarden